Phyllonorycter vulturella is a moth of the family Gracillariidae. It is found in southern Italy and France.

The larvae feed on Alnus glutinosa. They mine the leaves of their host plant. They create a lower-surface tentiform mine between two side veins starting at the midrib. The mine has one strong fold. The upper side of the mine is mottled and there is no central green patch. The pupa is made in a slender cocoon with frass grains deposited along the side.

References

vulturella
Moths of Europe
Moths described in 1968